Batingaw (English: Bell) was the late-night news program by NBN. The newscasts anchored by Aljo Bendijo, Kathy San Gabriel, Katherine Villar, and Buddy Oberas

On August 6, 2010, Batingaw was replaced by the returned Teledyaryo Final Edition, aired with the same anchors.

Final anchors
Aljo Bendijo
 Kathy San Gabriel
 Katherine Villar
 Buddy Oberas

Segments
 Pasaporte (JR Langit)
 Infomedico At Iba Pa (with Dr. Esperanza Cabral)
 Scoreboard
 Biz Talk
 Blotter

See also
 List of programs aired by People's Television Network

Philippine television news shows
2008 Philippine television series debuts
2010 Philippine television series endings
People's Television Network
People's Television Network original programming
Filipino-language television shows